The Zhirkindek Formation is a Late Cretaceous geologic formation in Kazakhstan. The primary lithology is sand with interbeds of clay and silt, and represents a coastal to coastal marine environment. The formation has produced numerous fossils, including Lindholmemydid and Trionychid cryptodires, indeterminate remains of dinosaurs (Ankylosauridae indet., Hadrosauroidea indet., Neoceratopsia indet., Sauropoda indet., Tyrannosauroidea indet., Ornithomimidae indet., Therizinosauroidea indet and Dromaeosauridae indet) and an indeterminate species of pterosaur Azhdarcho.

See also 
 List of dinosaur-bearing rock formations
 List of fossiliferous stratigraphic units in Kazakhstan

References 

Geologic formations of Kazakhstan
Upper Cretaceous Series of Asia
Cretaceous Kazakhstan
Coniacian Stage
Turonian Stage
Sandstone formations
Shale formations
Paleontology in Kazakhstan